Nilu (also Romanized as Nīlū; also known as Nīlū Rastegār) is a village in Qatruyeh Rural District, Qatruyeh District, Neyriz County, Fars Province, Iran. At the 2006 census, its population was 245, in 51 families.

References 

Populated places in Neyriz County